Carl Fitzgerald (13 May 1928 – 23 April 1954) was an Australian boxer. He competed in the men's heavyweight event at the 1952 Summer Olympics.

References

External links
 

1928 births
1954 deaths
Australian male boxers
Olympic boxers of Australia
Boxers at the 1952 Summer Olympics
People from Warwick, Queensland
Heavyweight boxers